Vice Chief of the Naval Staff (VCNS) may refer to:
Vice Chief of the Naval Staff (India)
Vice Chief of the Naval Staff (Pakistan)
 Vice Chief of the Naval Staff (United Kingdom)

See also
VCN (disambiguation)